Noah Eagle (born December 11, 1997) is an American sportscaster. The son of sportscaster Ian Eagle, he is a play-by-play broadcaster for NBC Sports' Big Ten Saturday Night and the Tennis Channel. He is also the radio voice of the Los Angeles Clippers.

Previously, Eagle was a play-by-play announcer for the College Football on CBS Sports''' #2 broadcasting team, as well as NFL on Nickelodeon, Fox NFL Sunday and Fox College Football.

Early life
Growing up, Eagle intended to follow in his father Ian's footsteps and pursue a career in broadcasting. A basketball fan, Eagle would shadow his father when he called NBA games. Growing up, he considered working as a television dentist - in a role similar to Dr. Oz or Dr. Phil.

Raised in Essex Fells, New Jersey, Eagle graduated from West Essex High School in 2015 and attended Syracuse University for college, graduating in 2019.Lab, Laura. "West Essex BOE Celebrates Graduates Who've Gone on to Career Success", TAP into West Essex, March 21, 2021. Accessed December 19, 2022. "Noah Eagle graduated West Essex High School in 2015 and Syracuse University in 2019." At Syracuse, he showed promise as a play-by-play announcer when calling the Orange's basketball, football and lacrosse games. Eagle graduated from Syracuse in 2019.

Career
In April 2019, Eagle tried out for the Clippers TV play-by-play job, but did not get the role. However, he was offered the radio play-by-play job for the Los Angeles Clippers, which he began in October 2019.

In the summer of 2021, Eagle worked the play-by-play assignment of 3x3 basketball for NBC Sports' coverage of the 2020 Summer Olympics, the first time the sport has been played at the Olympic Games.

Eagle joined CBS Sports in 2021 as the play-by-play broadcaster for their #2 broadcasting team for college football. His role consisted of calling games during the SEC on CBS doubleheaders and calling select CBS Sports Network games. Eagle worked in this role during the 2021 season due to Carter Blackburn, who had held that role from 2014 to 2015, and again from 2017 to 2020, being on sabbatical.

He has also called special NFL broadcasts for CBS' sibling cable network Nickelodeon since 2021, teaming with fellow CBS sportscaster Nate Burleson and Nickelodeon star Gabrielle Neveah Green on coverage of two Wild Card playoff games and a Christmas Day contest.

In 2022, Eagle was paired with his father's former announcing partner Dan Fouts for Los Angeles Chargers preseason games airing on KCBS-TV. Eagle would also move over to Fox Sports that same year, working as a play-by-play announcer for their college basketball coverage and later their college football coverage. Eagle has also spent time filling in on MLB games as a studio host for Fox. Eagle's first instance calling an NFL game on network television came in 2022 when he called a Week 6 matchup between the 49ers and the Atlanta Falcons on Fox, filling in for colleague Adam Amin, who was covering postseason baseball for Fox.

On December 17, 2022, Eagle and Burleson worked the 2022 Indianapolis Colts-Minnesota Vikings game for NFL Network. With the Vikings win, by a score of 39–36, in overtime, they came back from being down by 33 points at halftime for the biggest comeback in NFL history.

In February 2023, NBC announced that Eagle would be their play-by-play broadcaster for their newly acquired Big Ten Saturday Night'' package. 

His announcing style takes inspiration from his father and he does so through the use of information-packed analysis and lighthearted humor during the broadcast.

References 

1997 births
Living people
American radio sports announcers
American television sports announcers
People from Essex Fells, New Jersey
Syracuse University alumni
West Essex High School alumni
College basketball announcers in the United States
College football announcers
Los Angeles Clippers announcers
National Football League announcers